Gareth Lloyd Davies (born 17 September 1988) is a Welsh Conservative politician who has been Member of the Senedd (MS) for Vale of Clwyd since 2021. He is the first Conservative to win this seat since its establishment in 1999.

Early life and education 
Born in 1988, Davies is the son of Steven and Susan Davies. He attended Rydal Penrhus Senior School and Coleg Llandrillo Cymru. From 2010 to 2021, Davies worked in learning disability and mental health nursing, and physiotherapy for the NHS in Flintshire, North Wales.

Political career 
In 2017, he was elected to Denbighshire County Council, representing the Prestatyn South West ward. He also serves the Prestatyn South West ward on Prestatyn Town Council. He was elected to the Welsh Parliament, known as the Senedd, to represent the Vale of Clwyd constituency on 7 May 2021. He is the first Welsh Conservative to hold the seat since its establishment in 1999. In May 2021, he was appointed as the Shadow Minister for Social Services and elected to the Senedd's Health and Social Care Committee.

On 30 June 2021, Davies delivered the first Members Legislative proposal of the 6th Senedd. He proposed new legislation which would ensure a rights-based approach to services for older people in Wales. His proposal won the backing of Senedd Members, despite opposition from Welsh Government. 

In October 2021, there was a vote in the Senedd for the introduction of vaccine passports in Wales. Davies missed the chance to vote in-person as he was at the Conservative Party Conference in Manchester, and so attempted to cast his vote against the measure via Zoom. He was unable to do so, and the motion passed by a single vote, 28 votes to 27. This is seen by many as one of the most pivotal and famous moments of the Senedd since its inception in 1999.

In March 2023 Davies caused controversy after stating in the Senedd that there are “too many” Gypsy and Traveller sites in North Wales and adding that, “The simple message is that we don’t want them". He was asked to "rethink" his comments by Social Justice Minister Jane Hutt. His remarks were also condemned by gypsy and traveller advocates. Davies subsequently apologised for his remarks.

Personal life 
In 2018, Davies married Catrin Jones; the couple have a son. Outside of politics, he enjoys football, rugby, cricket, running and mountaineering.

References

External links 

 Gareth Davies MS Official website

Offices held 
Town and County Councillor for South West Prestatyn (2017-2022)

Living people
Conservative Party members of the Senedd
Wales MSs 2021–2026
1988 births